This article lists fellows of the Royal Society elected in 1954.

Fellows 

Sir Derek Barton
Sir Thomas MacFarland Cherry
Sir Ernest Gordon Cox
Sir Frederick Charles Frank
 Sir Austin Bradford Hill
Edwin Sherbon Hills
Christopher Hinton, Baron Hinton of Bankside
Frederick Ernest King
Heinrich Gerhard Kuhn
Hans Werner Lissmann
Frank Campbell MacIntosh
Leonard Harrison Matthews
Joseph Lade Pawsey
Max Perutz
Alfred Pippard
Rosalind Pitt-Rivers
Reginald Dawson Preston
John William Sutton Pringle
Francis John Richards
Claude Rimington
Werner Wolfgang Rogosinski
Frederick Sanger
Otto Struve
Henry Thode
William Alexander Waters
Carrington Bonsor Williams

Foreign members

Karl von Frisch
Otto Loewi
Manne Siegbahn

References

1954
1954 in science
1954 in the United Kingdom